Saint-Estève-Janson is a commune in the Bouches-du-Rhône department in southern France.

There is evidence of five hearths and reddened earth in the Escale Cave. These hearths have been dated to 200,000 BP.

Population

See also
Communes of the Bouches-du-Rhône department

References

Communes of Bouches-du-Rhône
Bouches-du-Rhône communes articles needing translation from French Wikipedia